Goniorhynchus butyrosa is a moth in the family Crambidae. It was described by Arthur Gardiner Butler in 1879. It is found in China, Thailand and Japan.

References

Moths described in 1879
Spilomelinae